Lego Masters (stylized as LEGO Masters) is an American reality competition television series that premiered on Fox on February 5, 2020. The series is based on the British series of the same name. Each episode features teams of two building Lego projects from a vast array of bricks and parts to meet both creative and practical goals set by the challenge for a particular episode. The show is hosted and executive produced by Will Arnett, with Lego Group creative designers Amy Corbett and Jamie Berard serving as the show's judges. Various guest stars have also served as hosts and judges.

In December 2022, the series was renewed for a fourth season.

Format
The series follows teams consisting of two Lego-building competitors, tasked with building creations out of Lego pieces based on a given theme within a given time period. After the allotted time to build, the teams demonstrate their creations to host Will Arnett and two expert judges from the Lego Group: Amy Corbett, a senior design manager at Lego, and Jamie Berard, who oversees the  Lego Creator Expert and Lego Architecture lines at Lego. The experts name the winning build and as well as the bottom two teams, explaining why teams were selected in this fashion. They then announce the losing team, who is eliminated from the competition. In addition to this judging, Amy and Jamie provide suggestions to the teams mid-way through the build. Early in the season, the team with the best design as judged by the experts will be awarded the Golden Brick. They can then use it on any other challenge, after the build period but before the judging, to automatically advance to the next challenge if they do not feel confident about their work. Once they turn in the Golden Brick for immunity, it is then made available as the reward for a future challenge. The season will culminate in a finale, in which top teams compete for $100,000, a Lego Masters trophy, and the title of Lego Master.

Production
The series is jointly produced by Endemol Shine North America, UK-based independent production company Tuesday's Child, and Plan B Entertainment. All episodes were shot at Chandler Valley Center in Los Angeles.

Casting for the series was announced at San Diego Comic Con 2019 and was described on the casting website as seeking "the most creative, passionate, and innovative Lego builder teams of two." The casting website stated that filming was to take place over seven weeks between October and December 2019. 

According to Corbett, there were more than three million Lego bricks available for teams to use during the challenges. Lego artist Nathan Sawaya served as a consulting producer for the show, helping to design some of the example pieces, the challenges, and the show's Lego-based trophy.

On November 11, 2020, it was announced that the series had been renewed for a second season. Production on the season began on March 15, 2021 at Atlanta Film Studios in Georgia. On April 7, 2021, it was announced that the season would premiere on June 1, 2021.

On December 3, 2021, it was announced that the series had been renewed for a third season, originally slated to premiere on May 31, 2022. On May 16, 2022, it was announced that the series will be getting a celebrity spinoff titled Celebrity Lego Masters: Holiday Bricktacular, while the third season was pushed to the 2022–23 season. On June 6, 2022, it was announced that the third season would premiere on September 21, 2022.

In December 2022, the show was renewed for a fourth season that will premiere during the 2023–24 season.

Episodes

Series overview

Season 1 (2020)

Season 2 (2021)

Season 3 (2022)

Special

Reception

Awards and nominations

References

External links
 
 

2020 American television series debuts
2020s American game shows
2020s American reality television series
American television series based on British television series
English-language television shows
Fox Broadcasting Company original programming
Television series by Endemol
Lego television series
American television series with live action and animation
Television shows filmed in Los Angeles
Television shows filmed in Atlanta
Reality competition television series